Lungten Namgyal is a Bhutanese politician who has been a member of the National Assembly of Bhutan, since October 2018.

Education
He holds a Bachelor of Science degree in Life Science from Sherubtse College.

Political career 
He was elected to the National Assembly of Bhutan as a candidate of DPT from Nanong-Shumar constituency in 2018 Bhutanese National Assembly election. He received 4311 votes and defeated Pema Wangda, a candidate of DNT.

References 

1985 births
Living people
Bhutanese MNAs 2018–2023
Druk Phuensum Tshogpa politicians
Sherubtse College alumni
Druk Phuensum Tshogpa MNAs